Art competitions were held as part of the 1936 Summer Olympics in Berlin, Germany.  Medals were awarded in five categories (architecture, literature, music, painting, and sculpture), for works inspired by sport-related themes.

The art exhibition was held in a hall of the Berlin Exhibition from 15 July to 16 August, and displayed 667 works of art from 22 different countries.  Additionally, the literature competition attracted 40 entries from 12 countries, and the music competition had 33 entries from 9 countries.

The art competitions at the 1936 Games were similar to the 1928 and 1932 Games, with medals being awarded in multiple subcategories for each of the five artistic categories.  The judges declined to award any medals for three subcategories, and no gold medals for another three subcategories.
Art competitions were part of the Olympic program from 1912 to 1948.
At a meeting of the International Olympic Committee in 1949, it was decided to hold art exhibitions instead, as it was judged illogical to permit professionals to compete in the art competitions but only amateurs were permitted to compete in sporting events.  Since 1952, a non-competitive art and cultural festival has been associated with each Games.

Architecture

Literature

Music

Painting

Sculpture

Medal table
At the time, medals were awarded to these artists, but art competitions are no longer regarded as official Olympic events by the International Olympic Committee.  These events do not appear in the IOC medal database, and these totals are not included in the IOC's medal table for the 1936 Games.

Dance 
Hitler wanted to add a further selection of artistic events that he believed would glorify the Nazis to the programme of the 1936 Games, including dance. The International Olympic Committee declined to approve any of the events, though dance had been among the original planned art events when they were first introduced. Still, dance was included as a demonstration event at the 1936 Games. Fourteen nations took part, and a festival with choreography and performance by Harald Kreutzberg and Mary Wigman was held. Rudolf von Laban had also been contracted to contribute, but his choreography was not deemed to be suitable propaganda and he was placed under house arrest. Kreutzberg and Wigman then also took part in the competitive part of the dance event, being among the (honorary) medalists.

Events summary

Architecture
Designs for Town Planning

The following architects took part:

Architectural designs

The following architects took part:

Further entries

The following architects took part:

Literature

Epic works

The following writers took part:

Lyric works

The following writers took part:

Unknown event

The following writers took part:

Music

Compositions for orchestra

The following composers took part:
{| width="100%"
|- valign="top"
|

Compositions for solo or chorus

The following composers took part:
{| width="100%"
|- valign="top"
|

Instrumental and chamber

The following composers took part:
{| width="100%"
|- valign="top"
|

Unknown event

The following composers took part:
{| width="100%"
|- valign="top"
|

Painting
Drawings and water colours

The following painters took part:
{| width="100%"
|- valign="top"
|

Graphic arts

The following painters took part:
{| width="100%"
|- valign="top"
|

Paintings

The following painters took part:

Unknown event

The following painters took part:

Applied arts

The following painters took part:
{| width="100%"
|- valign="top"
|

Sculpture
Medals

The following sculptors took part:
{| width="100%"
|- valign="top"
|

Reliefs

The following sculptors took part:
{| width="100%"
|- valign="top"
|

Statues

The following sculptors took part:

Unknown event

The following sculptors took part:

References

1936 Summer Olympics events
1936
1936 in art
Arts in Germany